The name Chanchu has been used for two tropical cyclones in the Western Pacific Ocean. The name, submitted by Macau, means pearl.

 Tropical Storm Chanchu (2000), (T0007, 12W) – formed from the remnants of Tropical Storm Upana.
 Typhoon Chanchu (2006), (T0601, 02W, Caloy) – Category 4 typhoon that traversed the Philippines and then made landfall in Guangdong, China

The name was retired by the ESCAP/WMO Typhoon Committee in 2006; it was replaced by Sanba in the 2012 season.

Pacific typhoon set index articles